The Chemins de Fer de l'État was one of the five main constituents of the SNCF at its creation in 1938.

It was formed in May 1878 from the merger of ten railway companies, not all of which had opened. In its initial renumbering of constituents' stock, the État renumbered its tender locomotives in the 2000 or 3000 block depending on the number of driving axles, and tank locomotives in 0200 and 0300 blocks. This scheme had to be abandoned in 1909 when the État bought the Chemins de Fer de l'Ouest in that year; as the enlarged État had by then too many tank locomotives for that scheme.

Locomotives from founding companies

Locomotives acquired 1878–1909

Locomotives acquired from the Chemin de fer de l’Ouest in 1909

Locomotives acquired 1909–1938

Preserved locomotives

References

 
Etat
Etat
Etat locomotives